The Tărâia (also: Târâia) is a left tributary of the river Olteț in Romania. It discharges into the Olteț in Ocracu.

References

Rivers of Romania
Rivers of Gorj County
Rivers of Vâlcea County